Oncholaimidae is a family of nematodes belonging to the order Enoplida.

Genera
Genera:
 Admirandus Belogurov & Belogurova, 1979
 Adoncholaimus Filipjev, 1918
 Anoncholaimus Cobb, 1920
 Asymmetrella Cobb, 1920
 Bradybucca Schuurmans Stekhoven, 1956
 Cacolaimus Kreis, 1932
 Curvolaimus Wieser, 1953
 Dentolaimoides Khan, 1994
 Dioncholaimus Kreis, 1932
 Filoncholaimus Filipjev, 1927
 Fimbrilla Cobb, 1905
 Fotolaimus Belogurova & Belogurov, 1974
 Krampia Ditlevsen, 1921
 Kreisoncholaimus Rachor, 1969
 Metaparoncholaimus De Coninck & Schuurmans Stekhoven, 1933
 Metapelagonema Sergeeva, 1972
 Metoncholaimus Filipjev, 1918
 Meyersia Hopper, 1967
 Octonchus Clark, 1961
 Oloncholaimus Mordukhovich, Zograf, Saulenko & Fadeeva, 2020
 Oncholaimelloides Timm, 1969
 Oncholaimellus de Man, 1890
 Oncholaimoides Chitwood, 1937
 Oncholaimus Dujardin, 1845
 Paradoncholaimus Kreis, 1932
 Paroctonchus Shi & Xu, 2016
 Patagonema Pastor De Ward, Lo Russo & Villares, 2015
 Pelagonema Cobb, 1894
 Pelagonemella Kreis, 1932
 Phaenoncholaimus Kreis, 1934
 Phylloncholaimus Bussau, 1993
 Pontonema Leidy, 1855
 Prooncholaimus Micoletzky, 1924
 Pseudoncholaimus Kreis, 1932
 Pseudopelagonema Kreis, 1932
 Thalassogenus Andrássy, 1973
 Vasculonema Kreis, 1928
 Viscosia de Man, 1890
 Wiesoncholaimus Inglis, 1966

References

Nematodes